Phacelia douglasii is a species of phacelia known by the common name Douglas' phacelia. It is endemic to California, where it grows in the coastal and inland mountains and foothills, the Central Valley, and the western Mojave Desert.

Description
Phacelia douglasii is an annual herb growing mostly erect to a maximum height around 40 centimeters. Most of the leaves are located low on the branching stem and are deeply lobed or divided into leaflets.

The hairy inflorescence is a one-sided curving or coiling cyme of several bell-shaped flowers. The flower may be over a centimeter long and is pale purple or bluish in color.

References

External links
Phacelia douglasii. Jepson eFlora.
CalPhotos.

douglasii
Endemic flora of California
Flora of the California desert regions
Flora of the Sierra Nevada (United States)
Natural history of the California chaparral and woodlands
Natural history of the California Coast Ranges
Natural history of the Central Valley (California)
Natural history of the Mojave Desert
Natural history of the San Francisco Bay Area
Natural history of the Santa Monica Mountains
Natural history of the Transverse Ranges
Flora without expected TNC conservation status